Ilex venulosa is a species of plant in the family Aquifoliaceae. It is endemic to Arunachal Pradesh.

References

venulosa
Flora of Arunachal Pradesh
Endangered plants
Taxonomy articles created by Polbot
Taxa named by Joseph Dalton Hooker